Paragraph 183 (known formally as §183 StGB; also known as Section 183 in English) is a public indecency law of the German Criminal Code, which prohibits "sexual self-determination" and public exhibitionism. From its adoption in 1871, at an increasing rate during the rise of the Nazis, and until as late as the mid-20th century, the law was used to enforce penalties (including imprisonment, and, at times, loss of civil rights) for cross-dressing and homosexual acts. As of 2021, the law's scope is limited to indecent exposure.

Historical overview 
Paragraph 183 was first adopted in 1871. At the time of the law's adoption, it referred to penalties for "anyone who publicly causes a nuisance by a lewd act" with imprisonment of "up to two years." In the earliest versions of the law, the loss of civil rights was also a consequence of breaking the law.

The statute drew legal influence from previous measures, including those undertaken by the Holy Roman Empire and Prussian states. The Nazis expanded enforcement of the law in the 1930s as part of the most severe persecution of homosexual men in history and the persecution of transgender people in Germany.

Historians Laurie Marhoefer of the University of Washington and W. Jake Newsome of Cornell University have argued that transgender people were a target of Nazi persecution through enforcement of the law, citing instances of charges against cross-dressing.

According to Marheofer, one notable instance of Paragraph 183 enforcement during the 1940s involved a self-identified transvestite, who was later murdered in Buchenwald concentration camp after a series of Paragraph 183 and Paragraph 175 convictions.

Enforcement and revisions 

Historically, the enforcement of Paragraph 183 has varied from locality to locality. In the more tolerant and progressive locality of Berlin, between 1919 and 1933, Magnus Hirschfeld's Institute for Sexual Science issued transvestite certificates in partnership with the Berlin Police Department, which served as a form of identification that could protect transgender individuals from arrest and prosecution under Paragraph 183.

Provisions of Paragraph 183 have remained in effect since its 1871 adoption, but it has been amended and modified several times to change the nature of the law and its scope (1876, 1939, 1969, 1973, 1998, 2008, 2015, 2021), now solely referring to indecent exposure. The most recent version of Paragraph 183 (adopted in 2021) stipulates that "A man [or woman] who harasses another person by an exhibitionistic act shall be punished with imprisonment not exceeding one year or with a fine."

See also 

 LGBT rights in Germany
 Transgender rights in Germany
 LGBT history in Germany
 Transvestite pass
 Cross-dressing
 Transgender people in Nazi Germany
 Persecution of homosexuals in Nazi Germany

References

Further reading

External links 

 Paragraph 183 provisions

1871 in law
19th century in LGBT history
East German law
Gay history
German criminal law
German Empire
Prussian law
Legal history of Germany
LGBT history in Germany
Criminalization of homosexuality
Law in Weimar Republic
Law in Nazi Germany
Persecution of LGBT people in Germany
West Germany
Sex crimes in Germany
LGBT-related legislation